Gerlach II of Isenburg-Arnfels was the Count of Isenburg-Arnfels from 1333 until 1379. After his death, the line of counts of Arnfels was extinct, so the lands were inherited by Isenburg-Wied.

1379 deaths
House of Isenburg
Year of birth unknown